Caio de Castro Castanheira  (born 22 January 1989), is a Brazilian actor, model and amateur racing driver who competes in the Porsche GT3 Carrera Cup Series.

Early life
Castro was born in Praia Grande, a city located on the coast of the state of São Paulo. At age 18, Caio left his parents' home in São Paulo to live in an apartment in Barra da Tijuca, Rio de Janeiro. Caio was discovered in a contest on Caldeirão do Huck television show, before that he worked with event production.

Filmography

Awards and nominations

References

External links
 

1989 births
Living people
Male actors from São Paulo (state)
Brazilian male film actors
Brazilian male television actors
Brazilian male models
21st-century Brazilian male actors
People from Praia Grande